Ernst Schertel (20 June 1884 - 30 January 1958) was a German author, probably best known for his 1923 Magic: History, Theory and Practice. He had an "astonishingly diverse career", including running an eight-member dance troupe, the Traumbuhne Schertel, which was active from 1925 to 1927.

Schertel's Magic: History, Theory and Practice was found to be one of the most-heavily annotated books in Adolf Hitler's personal library.

Publications
Die Nachtwandlerin (Drama) 1909.
Schellings Metaphysik der Persönlichkeit (Dissertation) Quelle & Meyer, Leipzig 1911.
Die Sünde des Ewigen oder Dies ist mein Leib (Roman) Die Wende, Berlin 1918.
Das Blut der Schwester - Okkulter Sensationsfilm in 5 Akten Wende Film, München 1922
Magic: History, Theory and Practice Anthropos-Verlag, Prien 1923.
François Grillard [pseudonym]: Das Mädchenschloß Privatdruck, ca. 1930.
Der Flagellantismus als literarisches Motiv 4 Bde. 1929–1932.
Der Flagellantismus in Literatur und Bildnerei 12 Bde. Decker Vlg., Schmiden b. Stuttgart 1957. (erweiterte Neuausgabe von Der Flagellantismus als literarisches Motiv)

References

1884 births
1958 deaths
20th-century German writers